The 2021 AIR Awards is the fifteenth annual Australian Independent Record Labels Association Music Awards ceremony (generally known as the AIR Awards). It took place virtually on 5 August 2021 in Adelaide.

The nominations were revealed on 2 June 2021 with all material being released in 2020.

At the virtual event, AIR CEO, Maria Amato said "Congratulations to all the nominees and winners tonight. In a year of continued lockdowns and enormous challenges it was great to see Australian independent artists continue to create new music and connect with engaged audiences."

Minister for Innovation and Skills David Pisoni said  “Congratulations to all the nominees and winners. You all richly deserve the recognition after what has been a challenging year for the music industry. The South Australian Government is proud to support these awards, showcasing the amazing artists that we have in this country across a wide range of diverse genres of music."

Performances
Emma Donovan & The Putbacks "Yarian Mitji" 
DMA's with "Silver"
Wolf & Cub "Blue State"

Nominees and winners

AIR Awards
Winners are listed first and highlighted in boldface; other final nominees are listed alphabetically.

See also
Music of Australia

References

2021 in Australian music
2021 music awards
AIR Awards